Jobby Justin (born 10 November 1993) is an Indian professional footballer who plays as a forward for I-League club Gokulam Kerala.

Career
Justin grew up playing football on the beaches of Vettucaud but did not take the game seriously until his eighth standard when he joined St Joseph's HSS. Playing for St Mary's Club, he was already being noticed in the city's football circles. After joining MG College, Justin continued to appear in tournaments including TNIE GOAL 2013.

After joining KSEB, he made the switch from the flanks as a wing back to the midfield. He then represented Kerala football team in the Santhosh Trophy where he started to play as a center forward.

East Bengal

2017–2018 season
On 18 July 2017 East Bengal signed Justin along with goalkeeper Mirshad Michu for the 2017–18 I-League season. On 28 August 2018 Justin made his debut for the club in the 2017–18 Calcutta Premier Division match against Railways. He scored in the 3rd minute of the game to give the Red and Gold brigade an early lead and there by winning the game 3–0.

On 2 January 2018 Justin made his professional debut as he was included in the starting eleven against Indian Arrows in the 2017–18 I-League. An injury to Trinidad and Tobago striker Willis Plaza opened the doors for him to the first 11. He returned the trust shown in him by coach Khalid Jamil by scoring in the next two fixtures against Churchill Brothers and Minerva Punjab. He made a total of 9 appearances in the season.

2018–2019 season
Justin extended his stay at the Kolkata club for another season. On 1 November 2018 He scored a brace against Shillong Lajong in a 1–3 away win. He improved significantly after Menendez took charge of East Bengal.

Justin was involved in 12 goals (eight goals and four assists), which counts for more than 50 per cent of East Bengal's total goals (23) scored in the season.

He scored in both derby matches.

On 26 February 2019, Justin was handed an interim suspension along with Aizawl’s Kareem Nurain for an incident during Eastbengal' home game against Aizawl FC. Justin was found guilty of spitting on Nurain after a second-half tackle, while the Nigerian was found guilty for fighting with East Bengal defender Borja Gomez.

On 5 March 2019 The AIFF's disciplinary committee imposed a fine of Rs 1 lakh on Justin, along with the six-match suspension.

ATK
On 3 April 2019, Justin joined Indian Super League club ATK on a three-year deal. He made 9 appearances and scored one goal for the club and won the league title that year.

ATK Mohun Bagan
On 3 August 2020, Justin signed a  two-year deal for the newly merged club ATK Mohun Bagan FC for their upcoming ISL season. However he suffered an ACL injury during training and is ruled out of the competition.

International career
In May 2019, Justin was named in the 37-men probables list for 2019 King's Cup by the newly appointed coach Igor Štimac. However he was dropped from the final squad.

In July 2019, Justin was named in the final squad for 2019 Intercontinental Cup. He made his debut in a 2–4 loss against Tajikistan, replacing Sunil Chhetri at the 88th minute of the game, playing the last 6 minutes of the game.

Justin got his first start for the National team in the following Intercontinental Cup match against DPR Korea, playing 54 minutes before getting substituted and scoring 69*88 goals.

Career statistics

Club

[a] All appearances in Kerala Premier League[b] All appearances in Calcutta Football League

Honours

Club
KSEB
Kerala Premier League: 2016–17

East Bengal FC
Calcutta Football League: 2017–18
Super Cup: 2018 Runners-up
ATK FC

Indian Super League : 2019-20

ue 
 2019–20 champion [ATK]

Personal
Quess EBFC Player of the Month (2): November 2018, December 2018

References

External links
 
 Jobby Justin at Indian Super League

Living people
Indian footballers
Indian Super League players
Footballers from Kerala
Association football forwards
1993 births
East Bengal Club players
ATK (football club) players
I-League players
People from Thiruvananthapuram
ATK Mohun Bagan FC players